Anđela Janjušević (born 18 June 1995) is a Serbian handball player for CS Rapid București and the Serbian national team.

References

External links

1995 births
Living people
Serbian female handball players
Handball players from Belgrade
Expatriate handball players
Serbian expatriate sportspeople in Hungary
Serbian expatriate sportspeople in Romania
Siófok KC players
Universiade medalists in handball
Universiade bronze medalists for Serbia
Medalists at the 2015 Summer Universiade
Mediterranean Games competitors for Serbia
Competitors at the 2018 Mediterranean Games
21st-century Serbian women